Russia participated in the Junior Eurovision Song Contest 2009 in Kyiv, Ukraine. The Russian entry was selected through a national final, organised by Russian broadcaster All-Russia State Television and Radio Company (VGTRK). The final was held on 31 May 2009. Ekaterina Ryabova and her song "Malenkiy prints" won the national final, getting 12.07% of votes.

Before Junior Eurovision

National Final 
On 14 March 2009, VGTRK announced that a national final would be held to select Russia' entry for the Junior Eurovision Song Contest 2009. A submission period for interested artists was opened and lasted until 20 April 2009. A professional jury selected twenty artists and songs from the applicants to proceed to the televised national final.

The selected artists and songs competed at the national final which took place on 31 May 2009 at the Russian Academy of Sciences' concert hall in Moscow, hosted by Oksana Fedorova and Oskar Kuchera. In addition to the performances from the competitors, the show featured guest performances by Dima Bilan, Valeriya and band "Domisolki". The members of the backup jury were Maksim Dunayevsky, Larisa Rubalskaya, Grigoriy Gladkov, Yana Rudkovskaya and Gennadiy Gohshtein.

At Junior Eurovision 
During the allocation draw on 13 October 2009, Russia was drawn to perform 2nd, following Sweden and preceding Armenia. Russia placed 2nd, scoring 116 points.

Katya Ryabova was joined on stage by four girls from a dance troupe. 

In Russia, show were broadcast on Russia-1 with commentary by Olga Shelest. The Russian spokesperson revealing the result of the Russian vote was Philipp Masurov.

Voting

Notes

References

Junior Eurovision Song Contest
Russia
2009